This partial list of city nicknames in Iowa compiles the aliases, sobriquets and slogans that cities in Iowa are known by (or have been known by historically), officially and unofficially, to municipal governments, local people, outsiders or their tourism boards or chambers of commerce. City nicknames can help in establishing a civic identity, helping outsiders recognize a community or attracting people to a community because of its nickname; promote civic pride; and build community unity. Nicknames and slogans that successfully create a new community "ideology or myth" are also believed to have economic value. Their economic value is difficult to measure, but there are anecdotal reports of cities that have achieved substantial economic benefits by "branding" themselves by adopting new slogans.

Some unofficial nicknames are positive, while others are derisive. The unofficial nicknames listed here have been in use for a long time or have gained wide currency.
Algona – Home of the World's Largest CheetoMike Conklin, Iowa town's claim to fame: the `World's Largest Cheeto', Chicago Tribune, August 26, 2005
Cedar Rapids – The City of Five SeasonsCity of Cedar Rapids, Iowa
Council Bluffs – Iowa's Leading Edge
Des Moines – Hartford of the West
Dubuque – Masterpiece on the Mississippi
Dyersville – Farm Toy Capital of the World
Earling - Progress Is Our Future
Emmetsburg – Iowa's Irish Capital
Fort Dodge – Mineral City
Fort Madison – Pen City
Grinnell – Jewel of the Prairie
Keokuk – Gate City (reported in the 1880s)
Knoxville – Sprint Car Capitol of the World
 Lake City – Everything But the Lake
Le Mars – Ice Cream Capital of the World
Sioux City – Little Chicago
 Wyoming - Christmas City
 Villisca – Living with a Mystery

See also
List of city nicknames in the United States

References

Iowa
Populated places in Iowa
City nicknames